Gindl is a Hungarian surname. Notable people with the surname include:

Caleb Gindl (born 1988), American baseball player and coach
László Gindl, Hungarian sprint canoer

See also
Gindi

Hungarian-language surnames